Iberê Bassani Camargo (18 November 1914, in Restinga Seca – 8 August 1994, in Porto Alegre) was a Brazilian painter, one of the greatest expressionist artists from his country.

Shortly after his death, the Iberê Camargo Foundation was created by his widow, Maria Coussirat Camargo. Since 2008, the Foundation headquarters and museum is located in a building designed by Portuguese architect Álvaro Siza. Thousands of paintings by Camargo are on display there.

External links
 Iberê Camargo Foundation website

1914 births
1994 deaths
20th-century Brazilian painters
20th-century Brazilian male artists
Brazilian contemporary artists